Sucha Beskidzka Zamek railway station is a railway station in Sucha Beskidzka (Lesser Poland), Poland. As of 2022, it is served by PKP Intercity (EIP, InterCity, and TLK services). This station is located about 2 km East of the town's principal railway station (Sucha Beskidzka railway station). This station is named after the nearby Castle of Sucha Beskidzka, as the word Zamek means castle.

Train services

The station is served by the following services:

Intercity services (IC) Warsaw - Kraków - Zakopane 
Intercity services (IC) Gdynia - Gdańsk - Bydgoszcz - Łódź - Czestochowa — Krakow — Zakopane
Intercity services (IC) Bydgoszcz - Poznań - Leszno - Wrocław - Opole - Rybnik - Bielsko-Biała - Zakopane
Intercity services (IC) Szczecin - Białogard - Szczecinek - Piła - Poznań - Ostrów Wielkopolski - Katowice - Zakopane
Intercity services (TLK) Gdynia Główna — Zakopane

References 

Station article at  koleo.pl

Railway stations in Lesser Poland Voivodeship
Railway stations served by Przewozy Regionalne InterRegio
Railway stations in Poland opened in 2017